Kate Hamill is an American actress and playwright.

Hamill is known for writing and acting in innovative, contemporary adaptations of classic novels for the stage, including Jane Austen’s Sense and Sensibility, Emma, and Pride and Prejudice; William Makepeace Thackeray’s Vanity Fair; Bram Stoker's Dracula; Louisa May Alcott's Little Women; and Arthur Conan Doyle's Sherlock Holmes stories. She also writes new plays and works as an actor, independently.

In 2017, The Wall Street Journal named Hamill "Playwright of the Year." She has been named one of the most-produced playwrights in America for every year ranging from 2017 -2022 by  American Theatre magazine, which is published by TCG Theatre Communications Group.

Childhood and education
Hamill grew up in a dairy farmhouse in Lansing, New York,
or as she puts it, in "a town with more cows than people.". She was "a small, high-energy, highly emotional child" and "grew up in a household that prized reading and literature". Her bedtime reading featured Greek myths and classic novels, including Jane Austen's works.

She married her long-term partner, actor and oft-time co-star Jason O'Connell, on January 20, 2020.

She received a BFA in acting from Ithaca College.

Career 
Hamill creates stories that are female-centered and feminist. As a playwright, she has a playful and theatrical style that features absurdity while examining social and gender issues. As an actor, she "tends to play truth-tellers, oddballs, and misfits: complicated people who color outside the lines."

Sense and Sensibility
Hamill's Sense and Sensibility premiered in a short run at New York City's Bedlam Theater Company in November 2014.  It had a longer run in 2016 directed by Eric Tucker, also at Bedlam.  Hamill played Marianne Dashwood.

Vanity Fair
Vanity Fair was produced by Manhattan's Pearl Theater in 2017, with Hamill playing Becky Sharp.

Pride and Prejudice
Hamill's adaptation of Pride and Prejudice premiered at the Hudson Valley Shakespeare Festival in 2017, directed by Amanda Dehnert. The production, in which Hamill and her long-term partner, Jason O'Connell, play the leading roles of Elizabeth Bennet and Mr. Darcy, transferred to Manhattan's Primary Stages. This play was published in script form by Dramatists Play Service INC.

Little Women
In 2019, Hamill's adaptation of Little Women opened at the Cherry Lane Theatre, directed by Sarna Lapine. This play was published in script form by Dramatists Play Service INC.

Dracula (a feminist revenge fantasy) 
In 2020, Hamill's feminist retelling of Dracula opened at Classic Stage Company, directed by Sarna Lapine. This play was published by TRW plays.

Ms. Holmes & Ms. Watson - Apt. 2B 
In 2021, Hamill's "cheerful desecration" of Sherlock Holmes stories opened at Kansas City Rep, directed by Jose Zayas. This play was published by TRW plays.

Emma 
In 2022, Hamill's adaptation of Jane Austen's Emma opened at the Guthrie Theatre, directed by Meredith McDonough. This play was published by TRW plays.

References

21st-century American dramatists and playwrights
Jane Austen
Living people
Year of birth missing (living people)
American women dramatists and playwrights
21st-century American women writers
American stage actresses
21st-century American actresses
People from Lansing, New York
Actresses from New York (state)
Writers from New York (state)
Ithaca College alumni